Each nation brought their under-20 teams to compete in a group and knockout tournament. The top two teams and the best third placed team advanced to the knockout stage of the competition. Morocco won the tournament after a 1-0 win over France.

Squads

Morocco 
Head coach:  Mustapha Madih

France 
Head coach:  Pierre Mankowski

Egypt 
Head coach:  Shawky Gharieb

Group stage

Group A

Group B

Group C

Knockout stage

See also
Football at the Jeux de la Francophonie

Jeux de la Francophonie
football
2001
2001–02 in Moroccan football
2001–02 in French football
2001 in Canadian soccer
2001–02 in Romanian football
2001–02 in Egyptian football
2001 in Cameroonian football
2001–02 in Polish football
2001–02 in Bulgarian football
2001